The  Chad women's national football team is the national women's football team of Chad and is overseen by the Chadian Football Federation.

History

The Chad women's national football team played its first international match...

In 1985, almost no country in the world had a women's national football team. A women's football programme was first organised in Chad in 1986. In 2009 though, there was no school, university or national competition for women though there are 38 teams for junior women and 32 for senior women.  Beyond this, there were no FIFA-recognised senior national or FIFA-recognised youth teams. A national team has not played in a single FIFA-sanctioned match, competed at the Women's World Cup, played in the 2010 African Women's Championships during the preliminary rounds, or the 2011 All Africa Games. In March 2012, the team was not ranked in the world by FIFA.

On 4 April 2019, the Chad women's national football team played their first international match against Algeria, for the 2020 CAF Women's Olympic Qualifying Tournament.

Background and development
The development of women's football on the continent has been lacking  a result of several factors, including limited access to education, poverty amongst women in the wider society, and fundamental inequality present in the society that occasions female human rights abuses. Funding also in an impediment, with most funding for women's football in Africa coming from FIFA instead of the national football association. If quality female footballers do develop, many leave the continent seeking greater opportunity in Northern Europe or the United States.

With a FIFA trigramme of CHA, Chad has limited female participation in football having only 1,010 registered female footballers in 2006. Rights to broadcast the 2011 Women's World Cup in the country were bought by the African Union of Broadcasting.

Home stadium

The Chad women's national team play their home matches on...

Kits

Results and fixtures

The following is a list of match results in the last 12 months, as well as any future matches that have been scheduled.
 Source: Match results of Chad women's, FTFA.td 

Legend

2019

2020

Coaching staff

Players

Current squad
 The following players were named on date month year for the xxx tournament. tournament.
 Caps and goals accurate up to and including 30 October 2021.

Recent call-ups
The following players have been called up to a Chad squad in the past 12 months.

Individual records

*Active players in bold, statistics correct as of 2020.

Most capped players

Top goalscorers

Managers

Competitive record
FIFA Women's World Cup

Olympic Games

Africa Women Cup of Nations*Draws include knockout matches decided on penalty kicks.African Games

UNIFFAC Women's Cup

Honours

All−time record against FIFA recognized nations
The list shown below shows the Morocco national football team all−time international record against opposing nations.*As of xxxxxx after match against  xxxx.Key

Record per opponent*As ofxxxxx after match against  xxxxx.''
Key

The following table shows Sudan's all-time official international record per opponent:

References

External links
 Official website, FTFA.td 

 
African women's national association football teams